This is the complete list of Asian Games medalists in karate from 1994 to 2018.

Men

Kata

Kumite flyweight
 55 kg: 1998–2014

Kumite bantamweight
 60 kg: 1994–

Kumite featherweight
 65 kg: 1994–2006
 67 kg: 2010–

Kumite lightweight
 70 kg: 1994–2006

Kumite welterweight
 75 kg: 1994–

Kumite middleweight
 80 kg: 1994–2006
 84 kg: 2010–

Kumite heavyweight
 +80 kg: 1994
 +75 kg: 1998–2002
 +80 kg: 2006
 +84 kg: 2010–

Women

Kata

Kumite flyweight
 48 kg: 2006
 50 kg: 2010–

Kumite bantamweight
 53 kg: 1994–2006
 55 kg: 2010–

Kumite lightweight
 60 kg: 1994–2006
 61 kg: 2010–

Kumite middleweight
 68 kg: 2010–

Kumite heavyweight
 +60 kg: 1994–2006
 +68 kg: 2010–

References
Medallists from previous Asian Games – Karate

External links
Asian Karate Federation

Karate
medalists